FC Helios may refer to:
 FC Helios Kharkiv, Ukrainian football club founded in 2002
 Tartu FC Helios, Estonian football club founded in 2010
 Võru FC Helios, Estonian football club founded in 2010